The Makriali Church was Orthodox Church located in Kemalpaşa, Hopa, Artvin Province of Turkey, on the border with Georgia. In June 1367 here in Makriali Church the royal wedding took place between the king Bagrat V of Georgia and Anna of Trebizond. Baedeker's Russia for 1914 mentions the interesting ruins of the old church of Makriali and a traveler of 1969 mentions "a deserted church on the open and low-lying ground to the left of the road... a little way to the north of and 4km from the present Soviet-Turkish border at Sarp..."

References

Georgian churches in Turkey
Buildings and structures in Artvin Province